The 5th Annual Interactive Achievement Awards is the 5th edition of the Interactive Achievement Awards, an annual awards event that honors the best games in the video game industry. It was also held as part of the Academy's 1st annual D.I.C.E. Summit. It was hosted by Patton Oswalt, and featured presenters included Cliff Bleszinski, Richard Garriott, Richard Hilleman, Don James, American McGee, Lorne Lanning, Sid Meier, Shigeru Miyamoto, Ray Muzyka, Natalie Raitano, Lucia Rijker, Jason Rubin, Jez San, George Sanger, and Steve Schirripa.

Halo: Combat Evolved won the most awards, including Game of the Year, and was tied with Ico for having the most nominations. Microsoft received the most nominations and won the most awards as a publisher.

Will Wright was also the received the of the Academy of Interactive Arts & Sciences Hall of Fame Award.

Winners and Nominees
Winners are listed first, highlighted in boldface, and indicated with a double dagger.

Hall of Fame Award
 Will Wright

Games with multiple nominations and awards

The following 25 games received multiple nominations:

The following five games received multiple awards:

Companies with multiple nominations

Companies that received multiple nominations as either a developer or a publisher.

Companies that received multiple awards as either a developer or a publisher.

References

2002 awards
2002 awards in the United States
February 2002 events in the United States
2001 in video gaming
D.I.C.E. Award ceremonies